Alama is both a surname and a given name. Notable people with the name include:

Surname:
Khodr Alama (born 1963), Lebanese businessman and music executive
Ragheb Alama (born 1962), Lebanese singer, composer, television personality and philanthropist

Given name:
Alama Ieremia (born 1970), New Zealand rugby union player and coach